Dimopoulos or Demopoulos is a Greek surname. The prefix "Δήμ(ος)" can be a shortened version of "Demosthenes" or "Dimitrios", but can also mean "people", whilst the suffix "όπουλος" means "son of". This surname may refer to:
Christos Dimopoulos (born 1958), Greek former football player
Dean Demopoulos (born 1954), American collegiate and professional basketball coach
Dinos Dimopoulos (1921–2003), Greek actor, film director, screenwriter and theatre director
Harry Demopoulos, American medical researcher
Konstantin Dimopoulos (born 1954), New Zealand sculptor and performance artist
Santa Dimopoulos, Ukrainian singer
Savas Dimopoulos (born 1952), Greek physicist
Stergios Dimopoulos (born 1990), Greek football defender 
Steve Dimopoulos (born 1972), Australian politician
Takis Dimopoulos (1898–1981), Greek essayist, novelist and philologist
Thanasis Dimopoulos (born 1963) Greek former football player

Greek-language surnames
Surnames